Limnocitrus is a genus of  plant in the family Rutaceae with one species, Limnocitrus littoralis. It is native to Vietnam and Indonesia, where it is found on the island of Java in Jepara. In traditional Vietnamese medicine different parts of the plant have been used as an expectorant, antitussive product, for exudation, and the treatment of colds and fevers.

It is an endangered species threatened by habitat loss.

Taxonomy
Limnocitrus is accepted as a separate genus in the subfamily Aurantioideae in a 2021 classification of the family Rutaceae, although it was not included in the molecular phylogenetic analysis. Other sources place it in the genus Pleiospermium, with Limnocitrus littoralis treated as Pleiospermium littorale.

References

Aurantioideae
Endangered plants
Taxonomy articles created by Polbot